The East Manchester Line (EML) is a tram line of the Manchester Metrolink in Greater Manchester, England, running from Manchester to Ashton-under-Lyne via Droylsden and Audenshaw. The line opened in 2013 as part of phase three of the system's expansion.

Route
The East Manchester Line runs on a mixture of reserved tracks and on-street sections with other traffic. Between Piccadilly and Clayton Hall stop, the line runs mostly along a reserved trackbed, it then runs on-street from Clayton Hall to Audenshaw, before running on a reserved route to Ashton.

From Piccadilly station, the line runs east, emerging from the station's undercroft, passing the reversing sidings, where trams terminating at Piccadilly reverse. Between Piccadilly and the first stop , the line runs on a reserved trackbed, running under a purpose built underpass under Great Ancoats Street. After New Islington, the line runs along Merrill Street with other traffic for 250 metres to  stop which is also off street. The line then runs along a reserved track along the valley of the River Medlock before serving two sporting venues;  stop alongside City of Manchester Stadium, the home of Manchester City FC, and then, after running through a short tunnel under Alan Turing Way;  stop, which serves the Manchester Velodrome.

The line then crosses Ashton New Road, and after a short reserved track section, it serves  stop.

It then runs into Ashton town centre on a reserved track alongside the road, crossing several roads before reaching the terminus at  stop, which is located next to Ashton-under-Lyne bus station, and a short walk from Ashton-under-Lyne railway station.

Route map

History
The route was constructed as part of the third phase of the Metrolink expansion, which included new lines to Ashton, East Didsbury, Manchester Airport and Oldham and Rochdale.

The line was opened in two phases; the 3.9 mile (6.3 km) section from Piccadilly to Droylsden was opened for a three-day free trial for local residents on 8 February 2013, it then opened to the general public on 11 February 2013.

The second phase; the 2.1 miles (3.4 km) from Droylsden to Ashton-under-Lyne, was opened on 9 October 2013.

Proposed future development

Stalybridge extension
Tameside Metropolitan Borough Council have stated their aspiration for the East Manchester Line to be extended from Ashton-under-Lyne to Stalybridge. In 2019 the Greater Manchester Combined Authority confirmed that the Stalybridge extension was being considered as part of their transport strategy through to 2040.

Services
As of January 2019: 
During all operating hours a service from  runs at 12-minute intervals to  via Manchester city centre. This service additionally stops at  during evenings and Sundays. 
Between 07:15–19:30 on weekdays and 09:30–18:00 on Saturdays a second 12-minute frequency service runs from Ashton and terminates at Media City UK.

References

External links

 LRTA entry on this line

2013 establishments in England
Ashton-under-Lyne
Manchester Metrolink lines
Railway lines opened in 2013